John Patrick Lyons (31 August 1873 – 24 November 1956) was a Canadian diver who competed in the 1912 Summer Olympics. He was born in Liverpool, England.

In 1912 he competed in both the men's 10 metre platform and men's plain high events.

References

External links
Olympics at Sports-Reference.com: Athlete Profile

1873 births
1956 deaths
Olympic divers of Canada
Divers at the 1912 Summer Olympics
Year of death missing
Canadian male divers